Charles Hunt Wolfe (February 15, 1897 – November 27, 1957) was a professional baseball pitcher. He appeared three games in Major League Baseball in 1923 with the Philadelphia Athletics, all as a relief pitcher.

External links

Major League Baseball pitchers
Philadelphia Athletics players
Bridgeport Bears (baseball) players
Portland Beavers players
Manchester Blue Sox players
Lewiston Twins players
Baseball players from Pennsylvania
1897 births
1957 deaths